Live at Last is the first live album by American singer Bette Midler, a two-disc set released in 1977, Midler's fourth album release on the Atlantic Records label. The album spawned from her live, recorded performance, "The Depression Tour" in Cleveland, entitled "The Bette Midler Show". The album was released on CD for the first time in 1993. A limited edition remastered version of the album was released by Friday Music in 2012.

Background and content
Live at Last documents a full-length live performance at the Cleveland Music Hall, Cleveland, Ohio on the 1976 Depression Tour, and sees Midler, her backing group The Staggering Harlettes and her band Betsy and the Blowboys covering material from her three first albums as well as The Supremes' "Up the Ladder to the Roof", Neil Young's "Birds", Ringo Starr's "Oh My My", the mock lounge act The Vicky Eydie Show doing a "global revue" and the song cycle The Story of Nanette. The album also captures Midler's rapport with - or loving heckling of - the Cleveland audience, a monologue about fried eggs and a part that since has become a staple of her live performances: the raunchy Sophie Tucker jokes.

Live at Last features two new studio recordings. "You're Moving Out Today", co-written by Midler and Carole Bayer Sager and produced by Tom Dowd was the only single release from the album (#42 Billboard's Single Chart, #11 Adult Contemporary). "Bang, You're Dead", which was also not performed during the Cleveland show, replaced "I Sold My Heart To The Junkman" on the album because writers Nick Ashford and Valerie Simpson - who wrote the song for Bette - laid down an ultimatum that if she didn't release the song on her next album they would give it to another singer. Therefore, the song was recorded in a studio and put onto the album.

Commercial performance
Live at Last reached #49 on Billboard's album chart in the autumn of 1977.

Track listing
Side A:
Backstage - 0:18
"Friends"/"Oh My My" (Mark Klingman, Buzzy Linhart)/(Richard Starkey, Vincent Poncia) - 2:28
"Bang You're Dead" (Valerie Simpson, Nickolas Ashford) - 3:15
"Birds" (Neil Young) - 4:39
Comic Relief (monologue) - 2:38
"In the Mood" (Joe Garland, Andy Razaf) - 2:09
"Hurry On Down" (Nellie Lutcher) - 2:07

Side B:
"Shiver Me Timbers" (Tom Waits) - 4:00
The Vicki Eydie Show:
"Around the World" (Victor Young, Harold Adamson) - 0:23
"Istanbul" (Jimmy Kennedy, Nat Simon) - 0:55
"Fiesta In Rio" (Bette Midler, Jerry Blatt) - 1:52
"South Seas Scene" / "Hawaiian War Chant"  (Rik Carlok)/(Ralph Freed, Prince Leleiohaku, Johnny Noble) - 5:13
"Lullaby of Broadway" (Al Dubin, Harry Warren) - 2:00
Intermission: 
"You're Moving Out Today" (studio recording) (Bette Midler, Carole Bayer Sager, Bruce Roberts) - 2:56

Side C:
"Delta Dawn" (Alex Harvey, Larry Collins) - 5:54
"Long John Blues" (Tommy George) - 2:36
Sophie Tucker Jokes (monologue) - 2:38
The Story of Nanette:
"Nanette" (Howard Dietz) - 0:54
"Alabama Song" (Bertholt Brecht, Kurt Weill) - 1:34
"Drinking Again" (Doris Tauber, Johnny Mercer) - 4:25
"Mr. Rockefeller" (Bette Midler, Jerry Blatt) - 4:00

Side D:
The Story of Nanette (cont.):
"Ready to Begin Again"/"Do You Wanna Dance?" (Jerry Leiber, Mike Stoller)/(Bobby Freeman) - 3:23
Fried Eggs (monologue) - 2:37
"Hello In There" (John Prine) - 3:16
Finale:
"Up the Ladder to the Roof" (Vincent DiMirco, Frank Wilson) - 2:45
"Boogie Woogie Bugle Boy" (Don Raye, Hughie Prince) - 3:04
"Friends" (Mark Klingman, Buzzy Linhart) - 2:21

Personnel
 Bette Midler - The Divine Miss M. - lead vocals
 The Staggering Harlettes - Sharon Redd, Ula Hedwig, Charlotte Crossley - backing vocals
 The Orchestra - Betsy and the Blowboys
 Don York - musical director, keyboards
 Lou Volpe - guitar
 Miles Krasner - trumpet
 Richard Trifan - keyboards
 Francisco Centeno - bass guitar
 Ira "Buddy" Williams - drums
 Joseph Mero - percussion, vibraphones
 Jaroslav Jakubovic - reed instruments
 Elizabeth Kane - harp

Production
 Lew Hahn - record producer
 Recorded live at The Cleveland Music Hall, Cleveland, Ohio.
 Mobile facilities provided by Fedco Audio Labs
 Jack Malken - recording engineer
 Remote recording produced by Arif Mardin
 Lew Hahn - re-mixing
 Tom Dowd - producer on "You're Moving Out Today"
 Charlie Calello -  arranger on "You're Moving Out Today"
 Jimmy Douglass -  engineer on "You're Moving Out Today"
 Kenn Duncan - cover photograph
 Steinbicker / Houghton - performance photography
 Bob Defrin / Abie Sussman - art direction
 Jerry Blatt - special material
 Bruce Vilanch - special material
 Bette Midler - special material
 Produced for the stage by Aaron Russo

Charts

References

Bette Midler live albums
1977 live albums
Atlantic Records live albums